Pleine-Selve may refer to the following places in France:

 Pleine-Selve, Aisne, a commune in the department of Aisne
 Pleine-Selve, Gironde, a commune in the department of Gironde